The Proposal is a reality dating series based on the American series of the same name that premiered on Seven Network on 27 August 2019. The show is hosted by Luke Jacobz. The series will feature same-sex participants.

A bachelor or bachelorette is hidden from view, and 10 contestants must introduce themselves and answer questions posed by the bachelor or bachelorette. Contestants are eliminated until the end of the hour, when the bachelor or bachelorette can choose to propose to one of the final two candidates.

Due to dismal ratings, the program was bumped to 9.30pm from Episode 4. The program was axed in January 2020.

Ratings

References

Seven Network original programming
2019 Australian television series debuts
2019 Australian television series endings
2010s Australian game shows